Hari Krishna Exports Pvt. Ltd., also known as HK, is an Indian diamond conglomerate, headquartered in The Capital, Bandra Kurla Complex, Mumbai, India. It was established in 1992 by Savji Dholakia and his three brothers. The company has manufacturing units at Surat in Gujarat and its marketing and sales office in Mumbai.

History
In 1992, HK started as a small-time diamond cutting and polishing unit in Surat with a few machines and employees. It later expanded to Mumbai to meet a growing demand for raw diamonds.

In 2005, HK launched its jewelery brand - KISNA. Today, it is the largest distributed diamond jewelry brand in India, available in over 6,250 jewelery outlets. KISNA offers over 563 designs of rings, earrings, pendants, necklaces, bangles, bracelets, and nose pins. It uses VVS diamonds and 18k hallmarked gold. From 2007 until 2008, HK grew by 49% and recorded a turnover of  1,025 crores ( 260 million at the time).

In 1994, diamond exports increased after an Israel client's referral to international clients. In 2001, the export company started to trade and manufacture diamonds of sizes ranging from 0.18 Carat to 0.96 Carat. In the fiscal year 2002–03, Hari Krishna Exports Pvt. Ltd. recorded a 200% growth.

The company is also involved in diamond jewelery manufacturing and exporting H.K. Designs and Unity Jewels. Through H.K. Jewels Pvt. Ltd., the domestic market is being catered to. Kisna Diamond Jewellery is a pan-India brand distributed through more than 480 distributors to more than 6500 retail outlets.

HK is exporting polished diamonds to 79 countries. Currently, HK manufactures over 40,000 carats of diamonds every month (500,000 carats every year).

Controversy 
The company received media attention for 'gifting' its employees cars, jewelery, and homes as bonuses on Diwali.  In 2014, it gifted 491 cars, 525 pieces of diamond jewelery and 200 apartments worth . In 2016, the company gifted 1260 cars and 400 apartments. The company gifted 600 cars in 2018. The claims were disputed by the Mera News portal, which reported that the employees are paid a salary on the cost to company basis, and the down payment of the 'gifts' are sourced from the amount deducted from the salary under the bonus title. The cars are brought under the company's name, and the employees have to sign a job bond of 5 years. The company benefits from the bulk discount and tax credit on the cars.

In December 2016, the company was issued notice by the Employee Provident Fund Organisation's (EPFO) Surat regional branch for violating the Employees Provident Funds and Miscellaneous Provisions Act,  1952, and Factory Act after two years of investigation. The company had registered only 17 employees under Employee Provident Fund (EPF) despite employing 3165 people then. It had not paid EPF to employees for several years. The EPFO ordered the company to deposit  with 12% annual interest and 25% annual damage penalty.

Recognition 

The Gem and Jewellery Export Promotion Council (GJEPC)'s Annual Exports Award for the Year 2002–03 to 2011-12 (for ten consecutive years).
The GJEPC's "Most Innovative Company of the Year" Award for the year 2012–13.
The Stevie International Business Award for the "Management of the year 2012-13"
The Stevie International Business Award - 2014 "Company of the Year – Manufacturing" and "Fastest-Growing Company of the Year (Asia, Australia and New Zealand)"
JNA Award "Outstanding Enterprise of the Year" in the year 2014.

Mr. Savji Dholakia, the founder and chairman of Hari Krishna Exports, is awarded the 4th highest civilian award of India, called ‘Padma Shri,’ from the Hon’ble President of India, Ram Nath Kovind in 2022.

References

Diamond industry in India
Companies based in Mumbai
Indian companies established in 1992
Diamond dealers